Hygroplasta merinxa is a moth in the family Lecithoceridae. It was described by Chun-Sheng Wu and Kyu-Tek Park in 1998. It is found in Sri Lanka.

The wingspan is 13–15 mm. The forewings are ochreous with a silky sheen and a dark brown pattern. The hindwings are ochreous grey.

Etymology
The species name is derived from Greek  (meaning bristle).

References

Moths described in 1998
Hygroplasta